Herman Yau Lai-to (born 13 July 1961) is a Hong Kong film director, screenwriter and cinematographer.

Filmography

 1987: Tragic Hero – Co-Cinematographer
 1987: No Regret – Director
 1988: The Truth – Cinematographer
 1988: Reunion – Cinematographer/Music
 1988: Law or Justice – Cinematographer
 1989: Triads: The Inside Story – Cinematographer
 1989: Sentenced to Hang – Cinematographer
 1989: Stars and Roses – Cinematographer
 1990: Vampire Kids – Co-Cinematographer
 1990: Fantasy Romance – Cinematographer
 1991: Don't Fool Me – Director
 1991: Freedom Run Q – Cinematographer
 1991: My Flying Wife – Cinematographer
 1991: The Magic Touch – Cinematographer
 1992: Cageman – Actor
 1992: With or Without You – Cinematographer
 1992: Best of the Best – Director
 1992: Deadly Dream Woman – Cinematographer
 1993: No More Love, No More Death – Director/Cinematographer
 1993: The Untold Story – Director
 1993: Taxi Hunter – Director/Scriptwriter
 1994: Don't Shoot Me, I'm Just A Violinist! – Co-director
 1994: Fearless Match – Director
 1994: Twenty Something – Co-Cinematographer
 1994: Cop Image – Director
 1995: No Justice For All – Director
 1995: City Cop II – Director
 1995: Highway Man II – Co-Cinematographer
 1995: Red Zone – Cinematographer		
 1995: There's Rock'n Roll in China – Director/Editor
 1996: All of a Sudden – Director
 1996: Ebola Syndrome – Director
 1996: Adventurous Treasure Island – Co-director
 1996: War of the Underworld – Director
 1996: Best of the Best – Actor
 1997: Walk In – Director
 1997: Troublesome Night – Co-director		
 1997: 97 Aces Go Places – Cinematographer
 1997: Troublesome Night II – Director
 1998: Troublesome Night III – Director		
 1998: Troublesome Night IV – Director		
 1998: 9413… – Producer/Cinematographer
 1999: Troublesome Night V – Director
 1999: Fascination Amour – Director		
 1999: Troublesome Night VI – Director
 1999: The Untold Story III – Director
 1999: The Masked Prosecutor – Director
 2000: Crying Heart – Cinematographer
 2000: Time and Tide – Co-Cinematographer
 2001: Master Q 2001 – Director/Scriptwriter
 2001: From the Queen to the Chief Executive – Director
 2001: Nightmares in Precinct 7 – Director/Scriptwriter
 2001: Killing End – Director/Scriptwriter
 2002: Happy Family – Director/Scriptwriter
 2002: Shark Busters – Director
 2003: Give Them A Chance – Director/Scriptwriter
 2003: Happy Go Lucky – Cinematographer
 2004: Herbal Tea – Director/Scriptwriter
 2004: Papa Loves You – Director/Scriptwriter
 2004: Astonishing – Director/Scriptwriter
 2004: Dating Death – Director/Scriptwriter
 2005: Himalaya Singh – 2nd Unit Director
 2005: The Unusual Youth – Producer/Cinematographer
 2005: Seven Swords – Co-Cinematographer
 2006: Cocktail – Co-director
 2006: Lethal Ninja – Director/Scriptwriter
 2006: Love @ First Note – Producer/Cinematographer
 2006: Fatal Contact – Producer/Cinematographer
 2006: On The Edge – Director/Scriptwriter
 2007: Whispers and Moans – Director
 2008: True Women For Sale – Director
 2008: Gong Tau: An Oriental Black Magic – Director
 2009: Permanent Residence – Cinematographer
 2009: Rebellion – Director
 2009: Turning Point – Director
 2010: The Legend is Born – Ip Man – Director
 2010: All's Well, Ends Well Too 2010 – Director
 2011: The Woman Knight of Mirror Lake – Director
 2011: Love Actually... Sucks! – Cinematography
 2011: Turning Point 2 – Director
 2012: Nightmare – Director/Scriptwriter
 2012: Love Lifting – Director
 2013: Ip Man: The Final Fight – Director
 2014: Kung Fu Angels – Director
 2014: The Second Coming – Director
 2015: An Inspector Calls – Co-director
 2015: Sara – Director
 2016: The Mobfathers - Director
 2016: Nessun Dorma - Director
 2017: Shock Wave - Director/Scriptwriter
 2017: The Sleep Curse - Director
 2017: 77 Heartbreaks - Director
 2017: Always Be With You - Director, screenwriter
 2018: The Leakers - Director
 2019: A Home with a View - Director
 2019: The White Storm 2: Drug Lords - Director
 2020: Shock Wave 2 - Director/Scriptwriter
 2021: 77 Heartwarmings - Director
 2023: The White Storm 3: Heaven or Hell - Director/Scriptwriter 
 TBD: Death Notice - Director
 TBD: Customs Frontline - Director

References

External links
 
 
 Video Interview of Herman Yau on 9 Dragons

Hong Kong film directors
1961 births
Living people
Hong Kong film producers
Hong Kong cinematographers
Hong Kong screenwriters
20th-century Hong Kong male actors
21st-century Hong Kong male actors
Hong Kong male film actors
Alumni of Hong Kong Baptist University
Alumni of Lingnan University (Hong Kong)